Worku Bikila (born 6 May 1968) is a retired Ethiopian long-distance runner, who specialized mainly in the 5000 metres. His 10,000 metres time of 27:06.44 minutes in 1995 was the second-fastest time that year, behind Haile Gebrselassie. He represented Ethiopia at the World Championships in Athletics on three occasions (1993, 1995 and 1997). He was a two-time winner at the Zevenheuvelenloop 15,000 metres, from 1997 to 1998.

Since retiring, Bikila has put his energies into forming two companies that have brought much-needed revenue to his local community in Dukam, Ethiopia: Worku Bikila Water Well Drilling Limited performs water well monitoring, exploration, observation, and abandonment services, while Worku Bikila Hotel is a hotel for international travellers.

International Competitions

Personal bests
 3000 metres – 7:42.44 min (1997)
 5000 metres – 12:57.23 min (1995)
 10,000 metres – 27:06.44 min (1995)
 Half marathon – 1:02:15 hrs (2002)
 Marathon – 2:11:48 hrs (2001)

References

External links

1968 births
Living people
Ethiopian male long-distance runners
Ethiopian male marathon runners
Athletes (track and field) at the 1992 Summer Olympics
Athletes (track and field) at the 1996 Summer Olympics
Olympic athletes of Ethiopia
World Athletics Championships athletes for Ethiopia
20th-century Ethiopian people